Emran bin Bahar (born 9 August 1961) is a Bruneian diplomat and is currently the Ambassador Extraordinary and Plenipotentiary of Negara Brunei Darussalam to the Russian Federation.

Bahar graduated from Keele University with a B.A. in international relations and continued studies for his master's degree in international relations at the Australian National University in 1994; from which received his PhD in 1998.

References 

1961 births
Living people
Alumni of Keele University
Australian National University alumni
Ambassadors of Brunei to Russia
Ambassadors of Brunei to Laos
Permanent Representatives of Brunei to the United Nations
Bruneian diplomats